Serhiy Anatoliyovych Seleznyov (born 17 February 1975 in Kremenchuk) is a former Ukrainian football player.

Honours
CSKA Kyiv
Ukrainian Cup finalist: 2000–01

Liepājas Metalurgs
Latvian Higher League bronze: 2002

References

External links
 

1975 births
People from Kremenchuk
Living people
Ukrainian footballers
FC Olympik Kharkiv players
FC Metalist Kharkiv players
Ukrainian Premier League players
FC Arsenal Kyiv players
FC CSKA Kyiv players
FC Kryvbas Kryvyi Rih players
FC Moscow players
Russian Premier League players
Ukrainian expatriate footballers
Expatriate footballers in Russia
Ukrainian expatriate sportspeople in Russia
FK Liepājas Metalurgs players
Expatriate footballers in Latvia
Ukrainian expatriate sportspeople in Latvia
FC Oleksandriya players
FC Kharkiv players
FC Hoverla Uzhhorod players
Simurq PIK players
Expatriate footballers in Azerbaijan
Ukrainian expatriate sportspeople in Azerbaijan
FC Dnipro Cherkasy players
Association football defenders
Sportspeople from Poltava Oblast